Veronica breviracemosa, synonym Hebe breviracemosa, is a plant in the hebe group of the family Plantaginaceae native to Raoul Island of New Zealand's Kermadec Islands, where it is found in coastal cliffs and headlands.

History
The species is very rare. It was once believed to have been consumed by goats to the point of extinction.  When the island's last goat was shot in 1983, that same day a goat hunter discovered a single instance of the plant. It was the only example found in the wild until 1997, when, as part of a weed-eradication program, people searching the steep, volcanic cliffs of Raoul Island discovered fifty of the plants. Cuttings and seedlings raised from these plants are now being planted across Raoul Island.  Nonetheless, the species still remains at severe risk of extinction, mainly through weed invasion of its unstable, volcanic cliff habitat.

Features
In warmer parts of the country, Veronica breviracemosa can flower throughout the year, while farther south it usually flowers in the summer months.  Fruits can occur throughout the year but are more common in the summer.

References

External links
New Zealand Plant Conservation Network

breviracemosa
Flora of the Kermadec Islands
Endangered flora of New Zealand